The Department for Innovation, Universities and Skills (DIUS) was a UK government department created on 28 June 2007 to take over some of the functions of the Department of Education and Skills and of the Department of Trade and Industry. Its head office was based at Kingsgate House, 66-74 Victoria Street, London SW1, which has now been demolished. In June 2009 it was merged into the newly formed Department for Business, Innovation and Skills. It was responsible for adult learning, some parts of further education, higher education, skills, science and innovation.

DIUS also had responsibility for a number of Non-Departmental Public Bodies (NDPBs). These included the Research Councils:

 Medical Research Council 
 Biotechnology and Biological Sciences Research Council (BBSRC)
 Engineering and Physical Sciences Research Council (EPSRC) 
 The Economic and Social Research Council (ESRC) 
 The Arts and Humanities Research Council (AHRC) 
 The Science and Technology Facilities Council (STFC) 
 The Natural Environment Research Council (NERC) 

Other NDPBs sponsored by DIUS were:

 Higher Education Funding Council for England (HEFCE) 
 Student Loans Company (SLC) 
 The Technology Strategy Board (TSB) 
 The Design Council 

In addition DIUS was the sponsor department for [NESTA] - the National Endowment for Science, Technology and the Arts.

Only some of DIUS's functions were UK-wide: it oversaw the science budget, provided through the Research Councils, for the UK as a whole. On the other hand, education is a devolved matter and there were corresponding departments in the Northern Ireland Executive, Scottish Government and Welsh Assembly Government.

The Department's strategic objectives were to

A number of education functions of the former DfES (largely those focussed on the 14 - 19 age group) were taken over by the Department for Children, Schools and Families.
The only Secretary of State for Innovation, Universities and Skills was the Rt Hon John Denham MP. In a foreword to the department's White Paper, Innovation Nation, published in March 2008, Denham outlined the importance of innovation as a national commitment:

The first Permanent Secretary, Ian Watmore, moved to a new appointment, leading to the appointment of Sir Jon Shortridge.

References

External links
 Department for Innovation, Universities and Skills: archived official website as of May 5, 2009

Video clips
 DIUS YouTube channel

Innovation, Universities and Skills
United Kingdom
Government agencies disestablished in 2009
Higher education in the United Kingdom
Innovation in the United Kingdom
Ministries established in 2007
2007 establishments in the United Kingdom
2009 disestablishments in the United Kingdom